Miss Pokhara is a beauty pageant which began in 1995 for the girls of Western Development Region. Miss Pokhara has been organized by Pokhara Jaycees since the start and has been a pave way to the field of professional modelling career and direct entry to the national beauty pageant like Miss Nepal.

Results summary
 Miss Nepal: Neelima Gurung (1997)
 1st Runners-up: Rita Gurung (1995), Sonie Rajbhandari (2014)
 2nd Runners-up: Binita Gurung (1996), Kripa Shrestha (1999), Jasmine Shrestha (2000),  Anita Gurung (2004)
 3rd Runners-up: Sipora Gurung (2013)
 Top 10: Durga Gurung (2015), Jyotshna Chettri (2018)

Awards
 Miss Personality: Neelima Gurung (1997)
 Miss Photogenic: Kripa Shrestha (1999)
 Miss Talent: Anita Gurung (2004)
 Miss Stylish: Sonie Rajbhandari (2014)
 Miss Friendship: Sonie Rajbhandari (2014)
 Miss Best Hair: Rasmi Adhikari (2014)
 Miss Best Dress: Sheila Rani Gurung (2003)
 Beauty with a Purpose: Prativa Dawadi (2016)

Titleholders
Color key

The winner of Miss Pokhara represents her city at Miss Nepal pageant. Since 1995, Miss Pokhara has been appointed to send its winner to Miss Nepal but during 2000 till 2013 there was no Miss Pokhara beauty pageant; however, one or two delegates were sent to Miss Nepal contest as the representative of Pokhara.

 Note: In 2014, Prinsha Shrestha who was the original 1st runner up title got dethroned from her title of Miss Nepal Earth 2014 for breaching the rules from her contract. Sonie Rajbhandari Miss Pokhara 2014, the 2nd runner up was then awarded as the new Miss Nepal Earth 2014 title.

History
The pageant has been run by Pokhara Jaycees, the sister branch to Kathmandu Jaycees which runs the Miss Nepal pageant, since 1994. Rita Gurung was crowned as the first Miss Pokhara, who ended up as first runner-up in the Miss Nepal 1995 beauty pageant when Pokhara did its debut with a high placement.

Only Neelima Gurung has won the Miss Nepal crown in 1997, so far being the only Miss Pokhara to win the crown of Miss Nepal. Miss Pokhara has the second highest number of placements after Miss Kathmandu in Miss Nepal pageant and is ranked second highest among regional contests in terms of placements.

Winners list

Placements

Miss Pokhara 2017

Miss Pokhara 2013
After 13 years, the 6th edition of Miss Pokhara 2013 had been held on March 4, 2013 at the City hall. A total of 25 contestants were vying for the crown of Miss Pokhara 2013, Rashmi Adhikari from Goripatan clinched the title with Laxmi GC and Shova KC won the 1st and 2nd runners-up respectively.

Placements

References

External links
 Official website
 Pageant

Beauty pageants in Nepal
Nepalese awards
Miss Nepal regional pageants
Recurring events established in 1995
Junior Chamber International
1995 establishments in Nepal